"Vivo cantando" ("I Live Singing") is a song recorded by Spanish singer Salomé. The song was written by María José de Cerato and Aniano Alcalde, and it was produced by Augusto Algueró.

It was Spain's second winning entry in the contest and the last to date.

Background
The song is a very up-tempo number, sung from the perspective of a woman telling her lover about the positive changes he has had on her, specifically that she now lives her life singing.

Salomé recorded the song in six languages: Spanish (Castilian), Catalan (as "Canto i vull viure"), Basque ("Kantari bizi naiz"), English ("The Feeling of Love"), French ("Alors je chante") and Italian ("Vivo cantando"). Israeli singer Rika Zaraï released a cover of the French version, which spent three weeks at number one in the French singles chart from 16 August to 5 September 1969.
In Spain the song reached 1 on the Spanish Singles Chart.

Eurovision
Two memorable aspects of the performance at Eurovision were Salomé's costume – a Pertegaz pantsuit covered in long strands of porcelain resembling beads – and the fact that the singer chose to dance on the spot during certain parts of the song. Dancing was against the Song Contest rules at the time; Salomé was not penalized, however, as the performers from Ireland and the United Kingdom had done the same that year as well.

It was succeeded as Spanish entry at the 1970 contest by Julio Iglesias with "Gwendolyne" and at the 1971 contest by Karina with "En un mundo nuevo".

References

External links
 Official Eurovision Song Contest site, history by year, 1969.
 Detailed info and lyrics, The Diggiloo Thrush, "Vivo cantando".

Eurovision songs of 1969
Eurovision songs of Spain
Spanish-language songs
Eurovision Song Contest winning songs
1969 songs